The Sacking of Bergen in 1393 was one of two attacks on Bergen by the Victual Brothers, a former trading guild turned to piracy. The second attack was many years later, in 1429. The Victual Brothers raided the town, pillaged and looted goods and killed the garrison and possibly also civilians. After they had taken control they proceeded to burn down the town before leaving with their booty.

References

Conflicts in 1393
Military history of Norway
1393 in Europe
14th century in Norway
History of Bergen
Bergen
Attacks in Norway
Piracy in the Atlantic Ocean
Medieval piracy